Punished Woman Lake is a natural glacial lake in northeastern South Dakota. It is located in Codington County, and borders the town of South Shore.

Punished Woman Lake is managed by the South Dakota Game, Fish, and Parks (SDGFP) agency as a fishery for northern pike and yellow perch. The lake is also inhabited by black bullhead, common carp, golden shiner, walleye, and white suckerfish. Due to the lake's shallow waters, fish kills during extreme summer or winter temperatures are not unusual, and the SDGFP re-stocks the lake's primary species as needed.

Legend 
Punished Woman Lake is named for a Sioux Indian legend that tells of a young woman who ran away with her forbidden lover, defying her father's wishes for her to marry a clan chief. When the woman and her lover were returned to the tribe's camp along the lake's shore, the enraged chief killed his opponent, and then shot an arrow through the heart of the young woman.

See also 
 List of lakes in South Dakota

References 

Lakes of South Dakota
Lakes of Codington County, South Dakota